Perillyl alcohol (IUPAC name: [4-(prop-1-en-2-yl)cyclohex-1-en-1-yl]methanol) and its precursor limonene are naturally occurring monocyclic terpenes derived from the mevalonate pathway in plants. Perillyl alcohol can be found in the essential oils of various plants, such as lavender, lemongrass, sage, and peppermint. It has a number of manufacturing, household, and medical applications. For example, perillyl alcohol may be used as an ingredient in cleaning products and cosmetics. 

Perillyl alcohol has shown some antitumor activity in laboratory and animal studies, but clinical trials in humans are lacking  

Perillyl alcohol is a metabolite of limonene, which itself is formed from geranyl pyrophosphate in the mevalonate pathway. Conversion of limonene to perillyl alcohol is accomplished via hydroxylation by enzymes that belong to the superfamily of cytochrome P450 proteins. Perillyl alcohol can be metabolized further to perillaldehyde (perillyl aldehyde) and perillic acid.

The name comes from the herb perilla.

See also
 Perillaldehyde
 Limonene

References

Primary alcohols
Terpenes and terpenoids
Cyclohexenes
Isopropenyl compounds